Smoke Lake is the name of several bodies of water:

 Smoke Lake (Alberta), Canada
 Smoke Lake (Ontario), Algonquin Provincial Park, Canada
 Smoke Lake (Minnesota), Cook County, Minnesota, United States
 Smoke Lake (Wisconsin), Oconto County, Wisconsin, United States